Lionel Banes (1904–1996) was a British cinematographer and special effects photographer. During and after the Second World War he was employed by Ealing Studios and shot the 1949 Ealing Comedy Passport to Pimlico. Later in his career he worked on a variety of television productions including many episodes of the 1960s series The Saint.

Selected filmography

Film

 Bedelia (1946)
 The Captive Heart (1946)
 Frieda (1947)
 Nicholas Nickleby (1947)
 The Loves of Joanna Godden (1947)
 Against the Wind (1948)
 Passport to Pimlico (1949)
 Train of Events (1949)
 The Blue Lamp (1950)
 The Magnet (1950)
  Valley of Song (1953)
 The Good Beginning (1953)
 Dangerous Cargo (1954)
 The Night My Number Came Up (1955)
 No Road Back (1957)
 That Woman Opposite (1957)
 The Surgeon's Knife (1957)
 I Only Arsked! (1958)
 The Haunted Strangler (1958)
 Fiend Without a Face (1958)
 The Lamp in Assassin Mews (1962)
 She Always Gets Their Man (1962)
 The Durant Affair (1962)
 The Battleaxe (1962)

Television
 Colonel March of Scotland Yard (1954-56)
  The Adventures of the Scarlet Pimpernel (1955-56)
 The Count of Monte Cristo (1956)
 The Saint (1962-65)
 The Baron (1966)
 The Avengers (1966)
 Man in a Suitcase (1967-68)

References

Bibliography
 Barr, Charles. Ealing Studios. University of California Press, 1998.

External links

1904 births
1996 deaths
People from Manchester
British cinematographers